Good Morning with Anne and Nick is a British daytime television show presented by Anne Diamond and Nick Owen. Both the presenters had previously worked together at  TV-am, ITV's breakfast franchise holder.

The programme, which was broadcast on BBC1 from October 1992 to May 1996, was a direct competitor to ITV's This Morning and broadcast in an identical mid-morning timeslot. The programme featured a mixture of chat, facts, tips, horoscopes and star guests and also included on the hour news and weather summaries.

Series
 Series 1: 12 October 1992 – 28 May 1993
 Series 2: 11 October 1993 – 27 May 1994 
 Series 3: 17 October 1994 – 26 May 1995
 Series 4: 16 October 1995 – 24 May 1996

Presenters
 Anne Diamond
 Nick Owen

Contributors
 Simon Bates (Our Tune)
 Stefan Buczacki (gardening expert)
 Tania Bryer (entertainment correspondent)
 Mark Evans (vet)
 Will Hanrahan (consumer expert, Presenter Good Morning with Will Hanrahan and Sarah Greene)
 Ainsley Harriott (cooking sections)
 Dr Mark Porter (doctor)
 Deidre Sanders (agony aunt)
 Lowri Turner (fashion expert)

References

External links
 

1992 British television series debuts
1996 British television series endings
BBC Television shows
BBC Birmingham productions